Franklin County School District is a public school district in Franklin County, Florida, United States.

It is the sole school district of the county.

Schools
Franklin County School (K-12)
Apalachicola Bay Charter School
Franklin County Learning Center
Franklin District Virtual Course Program
Franklin Virtual Franchise-Pace FLVS
Franklin Virtual Instruction Program
Franklin Virtual Instruction Program
source:

References

School districts in Florida